KBTX-TV (channel 3) is a television station licensed in Bryan, Texas, United States, serving the Brazos Valley as an affiliate of CBS. Owned by Gray Television, the station maintains studios on East 29th Street in Bryan, and its transmitter is located northwest of Anderson, Texas.

Although identifying as a separate station in its own right, KBTX-TV is considered a semi-satellite of KWTX-TV (channel 10) in Waco. As such, it simulcasts all network and syndicated programming as provided through its parent station but airs separate commercial inserts, legal identifications, local newscasts and Sunday morning religious programs, and has its own website. KBTX-TV serves the eastern half of the Waco–Temple–Bryan market while KWTX-TV serves the western portion. The two stations are counted as a single unit for ratings purposes. Although KBTX-TV maintains its own facilities, master control and some internal operations are based at KWTX-TV's studios on American Plaza in Waco.

KBTX-TV is also sister to Belton-licensed CW affiliate KNCT (channel 46), which shares studios with KWTX-TV.

KBTX-TV also offers CW programming on its second digital subchannel. Prior to the September 2006 merger of The WB and UPN, KBTX-TV offered UPN programming on digital. Following the merger, CW Texas was launched as a joint effort between KBTX-TV and KWTX-TV. On August 8, 2012, CW Texas became CW8 Aggieland, which carries programming from The CW, as well as a variety of local sports offerings and many syndicated shows.

KBTX-TV falls under the "KBTX Media" banner, which also includes CW8 Aggieland and KBTX.com.

History
KBTX was the first television station in the Brazos Valley, first going on the air on May 22, 1957. It broadcast from the same studio for its entire history, though that building has been added on to multiple times. Originally a primary CBS affiliate with a secondary ABC affiliation, KBTX became a primary affiliate of the latter network in September 1977 along with its parent station. Both stations then reverted to CBS in September 1983.

On October 14, 1983, KBTX flipped the switch on a new transmitter in the Grimes County community of Carlos. The  tower nearly doubled the number of homes the station reached.

Perhaps the most noteworthy coverage from KBTX was on November 18, 1999. Early that morning, the Aggie Bonfire stack collapses, killing 12 and injuring 27. The station provided non-stop coverage of the event, and served as a major source of information locally and nationally in the hours that followed.

KBTX began celebrating its 50th anniversary in May 2007. Many former on-air staff returned for the celebration, including some who guest-anchored newscasts.

In accordance with the original February 2009 date mandated by the federal government, KBTX permanently shut down its analog signal effective January 20, 2009 as it made the transition to digital television. On February 28, 2009, KBTX began broadcasting at full power digital from the enhanced Carlos tower, again expanding its signal dramatically. The station had been broadcasting on low power digital between its analog signal shutdown and the full power activation, in addition to being carried on cable systems and DirecTV.

KBTX and KWTX experimented with a jointly-run noon newscast in early 2009. News stories for both viewing areas were read from KWTX Waco studios for the first half of the show, with KBTX running live weather and additional local content from its studios for the remainder of the show airing in the Brazos Valley. KWTX aired its own live weather and content in its part of the market during that time. However, in late March 2009, the two stations returned to running separate newscasts, with KBTX citing "an overwhelming request from viewers for the show to be based out of the Twin Cities again."

In 2009, KBTX reached agreements with the nation's two major satellite providers. For years, Dish Network had refused to offer KBTX to the Bryan–College Station area and had simply carried KWTX. However, in 2009, Dish relented. On April 23 of that year, KBTX was made available in the Waco–Temple–Bryan market area. In May 2009, after years of carrying KBTX to the market, DirecTV announced it would be dropping KBTX from its service. In June 2009, an agreement was reached to keep the station available to customers of the satellite provider.

On September 12, 2011, KBTX launched a 4 p.m. newscast, titled First News at Four. It and Inside Edition at 4:30 replaced The Oprah Winfrey Show.

On October 10, 2011, KBTX began broadcasting its newscasts in high definition, making it the first live and local broadcaster in the Brazos Valley to have HD news.

Subchannels
The station's digital signal is multiplexed:

KBTX-TV subchannels

KNXG-LD subchannels

Coverage area
KBTX serves Brazos, Burleson, Grimes, Leon, Madison, Milam, Montgomery, Robertson, Walker and Washington counties. Grimes, Montgomery and Walker counties are part of the Houston market, but receive KBTX. Texas A&M University, Sam Houston State University and Blinn College are in its coverage area.

With its digital signal transmitting at the maximum power allowed by law as of early 2009, the KBTX signal also reaches Houston County in the Tyler–Longview market; Trinity, San Jacinto, Austin, Harris and Waller counties in the Houston market; and Lee County in the Austin market. KBTX's weather team monitors those counties and provides forecasts and updates, including during severe weather events. High school sports teams in those counties will also often be covered in KBTX's sports segments.

For most of its first half-century on the air, KBTX was the only station airing a full schedule of locally-focused news for the eastern half of the market. The brief attempt to produce a single noon newscast for this vast market failed in 2009 in part because of overwhelming viewer demand.

KBTX previously served as the de facto CBS station in Houston County in the Tyler market until KYTX signed on in 2004.

KBTX is part of a rare American television market, the Waco–Temple–Bryan Designated Market Area. Only a handful of DMAs in the country have multiple stations under the same network affiliation serving viewers (KBTX serving the Bryan–College Station area, KWTX serving the Waco–Temple–Killeen area), even though in this case, both stations are associated with each other.

Awards

KBTX earned a state-high 23 honors from the Texas Associated Press Broadcasters in March 2013, with the possibility of more to come in April 2013. Eight of the 23 were first place awards.

In November 2012, KBTX was honored with a Lone Star Emmy for outstanding evening newscast in a smaller market. This was the second Lone Star Emmy win for KBTX. In 2011, the series To Avery with Love won the award for health/science feature.

KBTX earned 19 honors from Texas Associated Press Broadcasters in its 2009–2010 awards, as announced in March 2010. Nine of those 19 were first place awards.

Only two other stations in the state earned more honors in the 2009–2010 awards than KBTX. News 3 also finished third in the entire state in first place wins.

In the previous year's TAPB awards, KBTX won 13 honors (four First Places, three Second Places, six Honorable Mentions), as announced in February 2009. Again, News 3 was among the most honored stations in the state.

KBTX competes in Division 3, which includes the largest Texas markets outside the four major metro areas (Dallas–Fort Worth, Houston, San Antonio and Austin).

KBTX also won an AP award for "Best Spot News Reporting" for its coverage of the Aggie Bonfire collapse in 1999.

Aggie Game Day, News 3 Sports' pregame show before Texas A&M home football games, is a multi-time recipient of honors from the national Telly Awards for outstanding local programming.

Also awarded a Telly was News 3's special, All the Best: 10 Years of the George Bush Presidential Library, which aired the day before the grand reopening of the 41st president's library and museum on the Texas A&M campus. The main exhibit of the museum was closed for months during an $8.5 million renovation that coincided with the facility's anniversary.

See also
KWTX-TV

References

External links
KBTX.com – KBTX-TV official website
MyCW8.com – The CW Aggieland official website

CBS network affiliates
Telemundo network affiliates
TheGrio affiliates
Television stations in Texas
Bryan, Texas
Television channels and stations established in 1957
Gray Television
1957 establishments in Texas